Brazos Mall is shopping mall located in Lake Jackson, Texas.  The mall is anchored by Dillard's, JCPenney, a combination of TJ Maxx & HomeGoods, and AMC Theatres. It is the only major enclosed shopping mall in Brazoria County, Texas.  The mall opened in 1976 after nearly two years of development by The MGHerring Group. The loan for the mall was originated and is serviced by Bradford Allen Capital.

Sears closed at the mall in 2017. After it closed, the mall owners announced that TJ Maxx and HomeGoods would occupy part of the space.

References

External links

 
 Financing Project Information

Shopping malls in Texas
Buildings and structures in Brazoria County, Texas
Shopping malls established in 1976